Jon-Paul Pittman (born 24 October 1986) is a football coach and former professional player who is under-18's coach at EFL League One club Forest Green Rovers.

Pittman began his career in Aston Villa's academy before moving to Nottingham Forest where he spent eight years. This also included two loan spells at Hartlepool United and Bury respectively. Following a short spell at Doncaster Rovers, he moved to Crawley Town.

A five-figure move to Wycombe Wanderers followed a season and a half later. He then joined Oxford United and after a short return on loan to Crawley Town made a return to Wycombe. A move to  Grimsby Town in 2014 lasted two seasons before signing for Harrogate Town in 2016. Pittman’s final playing club was Torquay United in 2017. A career ending knee injury meant Pittman announced his retirement aged 31.

Raised in England, Pittman made one appearance for the England C national team in 2008.

Club career

Early career
Pittman was born on 24 October 1986, in Oklahoma City, Oklahoma. He started his career at Aston Villa's youth academy as an eight-year-old, before he moved to Nottingham Forest where he served his scholarship. He went on to appear in FA Cup and Football League Trophy fixtures in his penultimate season there. To gain experience whilst under the management of Gary Megson, he was loaned out to Hartlepool United. The following season, he went to Bury on loan where he scored his first Football League goal in Bury's 3–1 home defeat to Chester City in August 2006.

Pittman's eight-year spell at Forest ended in December 2006. January 2007 saw him sign for Doncaster Rovers on a short-term deal to see him though until the end of the season. As a free agent Pittman was signed by Steve Evans at Crawley Town on 28 June 2007.

Wycombe Wanderers
Wycombe Wanderers' manager Peter Taylor put in a five-figure bid for Pittman. Crawley Town accepted and he officially signed for the Chairboys on deadline day 2 February 2009.

His first Wycombe goal was an important one, the winner in a 1–0 away victory at Dagenham & Redbridge on 17 February. The club celebrated promotion to League One that season, but were eventually relegated back to League Two the following season.

Back in League Two, Pittman scored a trademark goal during Wycombe Wanderers' 2010–11 season opener against Morecambe in a 2–0 victory. On 11 September 2010, he suffered a hamstring tendon injury and required surgery. This kept him out of action until mid-January, when he played 60 minutes in the reserves, scoring twice. Ultimately he scored four league goals in 19 appearances to help the club to a second promotion in three seasons. Pittman made 42 starts, 40 substitute appearances, and scored 17 goals in the Football League and FA Cup during two and a half seasons.

Oxford United
Having left Gary Waddock’s Wycombe Wanderers at the end of the 2010–11 Football League Season. He was subsequently signed by League Two local rivals Oxford United, on a two-year contract.

Crawley Town (loan)
Pittman made a surprise return to Crawley Town on a 93-day emergency loan. The winger contributed  one goal in four appearances during the clubs League 1 title winning season. Crawley's second successive promotion. Coincidentally, upon his return to Oxford in December 2011, he scored his first competitive goal for the club against Crawley Town in a 1–1 draw.

Return to Wycombe Wanderers
Pittman's Oxford exit came under Chris Wilder. With eleven other players whose contracts had expired. This alerted former teammate and Wycombe Wanderers manager Gareth Ainsworth to resign the forward on a one-year deal.

Grimsby Town
On 28 July 2014 Pittman signed for Conference Premier side Grimsby Town on a one-year contract, having spent time participating in pre-season as a trialist from mid July. Pittman entered the 2015 Conference Premier play-off Final as a 70th-minute substitute, in front of a Conference record 47,029 crowd at Wembley Stadium. The game was forced to penalties where Pittman missed the penultimate penalty in their 5–3 shootout loss to Bristol Rovers.

Twelve months later Pittman returned to Wembley, playing in Grimsby's 3–1 victory over Forest Green Rovers in the 2016 National League play-off Final. This victory saw Grimsby promoted to League Two after a six-year absence from the Football League. Pittman and ten others left the club after not having their contracts renewed by Paul Hurst at the end of the season.

Harrogate Town
Following his release from Grimsby Town, Pittman signed a contract with Harrogate Town.

He scored his first league goal against Worcester City in his first league game for the club in stoppage time.

Torquay United
Pittman signed a two year contract with Devonshire club Torquay United. He was transfer-listed by Torquay at the end of the 2017–18 season.

On 3 August 2018, Pittman signed for Truro City on a season-long loan ahead of the 2018-19 National League South season.

He was seriously injured on 5 January 2019 in a game against Welling United  suffering a patellar tendon avulsion fracture which required surgery. He returned to Torquay for the remainder of the season to receive medical treatment. The injury signalled the end of Pittman’s playing career and saw him move into coaching.

International career
England C manager Paul Fairclough called up Pittman, for whom he gained a cap against Italy in the 2007–09 International Challenge Trophy.

Coaching career
After retiring from professional football Pittman completed his UEFA A Licence. He was part of the cohort that piloted the Premier League Professional Player to Coach Scheme. His role as Academy Development Coach at Exeter City ended in January 2022, when Pittman was hired to become Professional Development Phase Coach of Forest Green Rovers.

Career statistics

Honours
Wycombe Wanderers
 Football League Two third place promotion: 2008–09, 2010–11

Grimsby Town
 National League play-offs: 2016
FA Trophy runner-up: 2015–16

References

External links

1986 births
Living people
Sportspeople from Oklahoma City
Soccer players from Oklahoma
American soccer players
English footballers
England semi-pro international footballers
Association football forwards
Aston Villa F.C. players
Nottingham Forest F.C. players
Hartlepool United F.C. players
Bury F.C. players
Doncaster Rovers F.C. players
Crawley Town F.C. players
Wycombe Wanderers F.C. players
Oxford United F.C. players
Grimsby Town F.C. players
Torquay United F.C. players
English Football League players
National League (English football) players
Harrogate Town A.F.C. players
Exeter City F.C. non-playing staff
Forest Green Rovers F.C. non-playing staff